Harry Beaumont (birth unknown – death unknown), also known by the nickname of "Dickie", was a professional rugby league footballer who played in the 1900s and 1910s.

Playing career

Challenge Cup Final appearances
Dickie Beaumont played as a forward, i.e. number 13, in Wakefield Trinity's 17-0 victory over Hull F.C. in the 1909 Challenge Cup Final during the 1908–09 season at Headingley Rugby Stadium, Leeds on Tuesday 20 April 1909, in front of a crowd of 23,587.

Notable tour matches
Dickie Beaumont played as a forward, i.e. number 12, in Wakefield Trinity's 20-13 victory over Australia in the 1908–09 Kangaroo tour of Great Britain match at Belle Vue, Wakefield on Saturday 19 December 1908.

References

External links
Search for "Beaumont" at rugbyleagueproject.org
Search for "Harry Beaumont" at britishnewspaperarchive.co.uk
Search for "Dickie Beaumont" at britishnewspaperarchive.co.uk

Year of birth missing
 English rugby league players
Year of death missing
Place of birth missing
Place of death missing
Rugby league forwards
Rugby league fullbacks
Rugby league utility players
Wakefield Trinity players